Dosabhai Framji Karaka (1829–1902) was an Indian newspaper editor and official, known for his history of the Parsis.

He was educated at the Elphinstone Institution. After editing a Gujarati paper, he became manager of the Bombay Times. He spent 1858–9 in England, where he wrote The Parsis: their history, manners, customs, and religion. Returning to India, he held a number of legal and official positions. He became chairman of the Bombay Municipal Corporation.

He was selected Sheriff of Mumbai for 1872.

His grandson, also known as Dosabhai Framji Karaka was also a journalist of much repute. Karaka became an active member of the Oxford Union, participating in debates. He would occupy a number of posts - Treasurer, Secretary and Librarian - before being elected the first President of South Asian origin of the Oxford Union. He succeeded Michael Foot, who was a close friend of his.

References

1829 births
1902 deaths
19th-century Indian historians
Members of the Bombay Legislative Council
Parsi people
Sheriffs of Mumbai
Zoroastrian studies scholars
19th-century translators